Hayden Triggs (born 22 February 1982) is a New Zealand former rugby union player who played as a lock. He last played for Leinster in the Pro14.

Provincial

A former Army mechanic, Triggs was a long-time regular in the Manawatu side, earning 70 caps between 2002 and 2008. Following his signing by the Highlanders in Super 14, Triggs transferred to Otago, appearing in 13 matches in 2009. In the 2010 ITM Cup, Triggs started all 13 matches for Otago and registered two tries. Following the 2010 season, Triggs transferred to Waikato to be closer to his family on the North Island.

Super Rugby

Following his strong performances for Manawatu, Triggs received an opportunity to graduate to the Super 14 competition in 2007 with the Hurricanes, but was limited to only one appearance as a substitute. He had previously been a part of the Hurricanes' Wider Training Group in 2006.
For 2008, Triggs moved to the Highlanders, where he emerged as a squad regular making 11 appearances including 7 starts. In 2009, Triggs appeared in all 13 Highlanders matches, starting in 10 of them.

In 2010, Triggs started the season as a substitute behind All-Black Tom Donnelly and Josh Bekhuis, but following a season-ending injury to Donnelly Triggs started the final 8 matches of the season. During this stretch, he scored his first two tries in Super Rugby, and his strong performances saw him selected to the New Zealand Māori squad at year-end.

For the 2011 Super Rugby season, Triggs transferred to the Chiefs. However, he found himself down the pecking order, and made only three appearances during the campaign.

In 2014 he was called into the Blues to replace the injured Culum Retallick.

International

Triggs was first selected to the New Zealand Māori squad for the 2007 Churchill Cup tournament, where he made three appearances (Canada, Ireland A, England Saxons).
In 2008, Triggs was again selected for the Māori squad for the Pacific Nations Cup but was ruled out before the tournament because of a stress fracture to his foot.
Triggs was again selected to the New Zealand Māori for their 2010 Centenary Series. He scored a try against the Barbarians, and started in the squad's historic victories over Ireland and England.

References

External links 
 [Blues profile]

1982 births
Living people
New Zealand rugby union players
Rugby union players from Lower Hutt
Rugby union locks
Māori All Blacks players
Manawatu rugby union players
Otago rugby union players
Hurricanes (rugby union) players
Highlanders (rugby union) players
Chiefs (rugby union) players
Blues (Super Rugby) players
Expatriate rugby union players in Japan
New Zealand expatriate sportspeople in Japan
Mie Honda Heat players
North Harbour rugby union players